Willacy is a surname. Notable people with the surname include:

David Willacy (1916–1941), English footballer
John G. Willacy (1859–1943), American politician
Mark Willacy, Australian journalist
Sarah Willacy (born 1995), Australian soccer player

See also
 Willacy County, Texas